Echo Lake (formerly, Echo) is a small unincorporated community in El Dorado County, California, United States, along U.S. Route 50 in the mountains of the Sierra Nevada. Echo Lake's nearest neighboring town is Little Norway. The ZIP code is 95721. The community is inside area code 530. The elevation of Echo Lake is 7539 feet (2298 m). The average snowpack per year is 10.5 feet, with over 15 feet of snow depositing in certain areas. Precipitation and accumulation at Echo Lake can be found in California Data Exchange Center stations located at Echo Peak (EP5) and Echo Summit (ECS).

Echo post office operated from 1888 to 1913, with a closure from 1910 to 1911. Echo Lake post office operated from 1926 to 1973.

References

http://www.trailspotting.com/2008/02/echo-lakes.html

Unincorporated communities in California
Unincorporated communities in El Dorado County, California